The 767th Bombardment Squadron is a former United States Army Air Forces unit. The squadron was activated on 1 July 1943.  After training in the United States, in early 1944 it deployed to the Mediterranean Theater of Operations, where it participated in the strategic bombing campaign against Germany, and earned two Distinguished Unit Citations for its actions.  Following V-E Day, the squadron returned to the United States, where it was inactivated on 18 August 1945.

History
The 767th Bombardment Squadron was activated at Wendover Field, Utah on 1 July 1943 as one of the four squadrons originally assigned to the 461st Bombardment Group.  After training with Consolidated B-24 Liberators under Second and Fourth Air Forces in the United States, the squadron departed for the Mediterranean Theater of Operations on New Year's Day of 1944.

The squadron arrived at its combat station, Torretto Airfield, Italy by the end of February 1944.  The air echelon ferried its Liberators to Italy via the Southern Ferry Route, pausing for additional training in North Africa before joining the ground echelon in Italy.  The squadron flew its first combat mission in April 1944.

The squadron was engaged primarily in the strategic bombing campaign against Germany, attacking communications, industrial facilities and other enemy strategic targets in Austria, Czechoslovakia, France, Germany, Greece, Italy, Romania and Yugoslavia.  It participated in the campaign against Axis petroleum production with attacks against facilities at Brux Czechoslovakia; Blechhammer, Germany; and Moosbierbaum and Vienna in Austria.  It received a Distinguished Unit Citation (DUC) for an attack on petroleum facilities at Ploiești, Romania on 15 July 1944, when it heavily damaged its objective, despite clouds and smoke obscuring the target and opposition by flak and interceptors.

it also conducted strategic attacks against enemy airfields and aircraft manufacturing centers.  On one of its early missions, it attacked an aircraft component manufacturing facility at Budapest, Hungary, battling its way through enemy air defenses.  This attack earned the squadron its first DUC.

The squadron was occasionally diverted from its strategic mission, flying air support and air interdiction missions.  During Operation Dragoon, the invasion of southern France in August 1944, it hit artillery positions.  The following month it flew airlift missions, transporting supplies to forces in France.  Some of its last missions were flown to support Operation Grapeshot, the spring 1945 offensive in northern Italy.

Following V-E Day, the squadron flew supplies to prisoners of war in Austria.  It began returning to the United States in early July. It reassembled at Sioux Falls Army Air Field, South Dakota at the end of the month and was inactivated there on 28 August 1945.

Lineage
 Constituted as the 767th Bombardment Squadron (Heavy) on 19 May 1943
 Activated on 1 July 1943
 Redesignated 767th Bombardment Squadron, Heavy c. 1944
 Inactivated on 28 August 1945

Assignments
 461st Bombardment Group, 1 July 1943 – 28 August 1945

Stations

 Wendover Field, Utah 1 July 1943
 Gowen Field, Idaho, 29 July 1943
 Kearns Army Air Base, Utah 11 September 1943
 Wendover Field, Utah, 30 September 1943

 Hammer Field, California, 30 October 1943 – 1 January 1944
 Venosa Airfield, Italy, c. 18 February 1944
 Torretto Airfield, Italy c. 23 February 1944 – 1 July 1945
 Sioux Falls Army Air Field, South Dakota, 22 July–28 August 1945

Aircraft
 Consolidated B-24 Liberator, 1943–1945

Awards and campaigns

See also

 B-24 Liberator units of the United States Army Air Forces

References

Notes

Bibliography

 
 

Bombardment squadrons of the United States Army Air Forces
World War II strategic bombing units
Military units and formations established in 1943